The 2019–20 Armenia Basketball League A is the second season of the basketball first division of Armenia.

Aragats are the defending champions.

Competition format
The regular season consists in a double-legged round-robin tournament where the six teams qualify for the playoffs.

Teams

Six teams will take part in the competition. Gyumri and Erebuni replaced Artsakh and Artik.

Former Erebuni changed its name to Yerevan.

Regular season

League table

Results

Playoffs
The playoffs are played in a best-of-seven format, with the series starting 1–1 or 2–0 depending on the head-to-head games in the regular season. The other five matches are played as 1-1-1-1-1.

Final will be played in a best-of-nine format with the same format as in the previous series.

Bracket

Quarter-finals

|}

Semi-finals

Finals

References

External links
Armenian basketball at Eurobasket.com
League A at Facebook
Basketball Federation of Armenia at Facebook

Armenian
Armenia Basketball League A